The 2016 L'Alcúdia International Football Tournament is a football competition which took place in July and August 2016. The 2016 edition was the first to feature only international youth teams. Previous editions have contained a mix of national selections and club selections.

Teams
The participating national teams are:

Notes

 China and Russia were announced as participants when eight teams had been announced but were later replaced with Costa Rica, Mauritania, Morocco and Venezuela.

Group stage

Group A

Group B

Play-off stage

Semi-finals

Final

References

International association football competitions hosted by Spain
Youth association football competitions for international teams
2016 in association football
2016–17 in Spanish football
July 2016 sports events in Europe
August 2016 sports events in Europe